Johan Hellsten (born 25 December 1975) is a Swedish chess grandmaster. He was Swedish Chess Champion in 2006.

Chess career
Born in 1975, Hellsten earned his international master title in 1995 and his grandmaster title in 2004. In 2006, he won the Swedish Chess Championship. He played for Sweden in the Chess Olympiads of 1996, 2004 and 2006 and in the European Team Chess Championships of 1997, 2003 and 2005. He tied for second–sixth with Laurent Fressinet, Vladimir Baklan, Robert Fontaine and Erik van den Doel in the Abihome Open 2000 and tied for first with Dmitry Svetushkin and Marcin Szymanski in the Ikaros Chess Festival 2003. As of the July 2020 rating FIDE list, he has an Elo rating of 2550, making him the No. 4 ranked Swedish player, though he is inactive.
Hellsten was champion in the chess tournament "Semana Valdiviana", Chile, 2002.

Bibliography

References

External links

1975 births
Living people
Chess grandmasters
Chess Olympiad competitors
Chess writers
Swedish chess players